Aparté is a French classical music record label founded in 2010 by Nicolas Bartholomée, director of Little Tribeca recording studios. Bartholomée had earlier founded the recording studio Musica Numeris in the late 1980s, and the Ambroisie label in 1999, later sold to Naïve Records.

Artists

Soloists : 
 Christophe Rousset (harpsichord)
 Ophélie Gaillard (cello)
 Michel Dalberto (piano)
 Pierre Génisson (clarinet)
 Romain Leleu (trumpet)
 Alexis Kossenko (flute)
 Julien Chauvin (violin)
 Atsushi Sakai (viola da gamba)
 Blandine Verlet (harpsichord)
 Gottfried von der Goltz (violin)
  Emmanuel Ceysson (harp)

Singers : 
 Xavier Sabata
 Sandrine Piau
 Karine Deshayes
 Julie Fuchs
 Lea Desandre
 Veronique Gens
 Tassis Christoyannis
 Sabine Devieilhe
 Stéphane Degout
 Teodora Gheorghiu
 Marianne Crebassa

Ensembles :
 Les Talens Lyriques
 London Philharmonic Orchestra
 BBC Symphony Orchestra
 Orchestre de chambre de Paris
 Orchestre d'Auvergne
 Orchestre Philharmonique de Monte-Carlo
 Les Ambassadeurs
 Le Concert de la Loge
 Les Cris de Paris
 Ensemble Contraste

References

Classical music record labels
French record labels
Record labels established in 2010
2010 establishments in France